Md. Ruhul Amin is a Bangladeshi jurist who served as the 15th Chief Justice of Bangladesh from 1 March 2007 until 31 May 2008.

References

Living people
People from Lakhimpur district
Supreme Court of Bangladesh justices
Chief justices of Bangladesh
Place of birth missing (living people)
Year of birth missing (living people)